Comalies XX is the first remix album by Italian gothic metal band Lacuna Coil. It was released by Century Media Records on 14 October 2022. The album is a rearranged re-recording of the band's 2002 album Comalies.

Background
In June 2021, Cristina Scabbia, during an interview with Revolver magazine, talked about the hard situation for writing new music. "Everything we do in a regular life, in a normal life enriches us and gives us input that we can put in our music," she said. "And also we like to write together. So, if Marco creates the basis of the music together with the other musicians in the band, then Andrea and I jump in with the lyrics and vocal lines. But we do that together. We need to enter in songwriting mode. So we didn't really like the fact that we had to write separately just because we have to put a record [together] because it's quarantine. Now we are starting to collect ideas 'cause we feel a little bit happier."

On February 22, the band shared on Instagram a photo from a studio, recording a very special project.

On 9 May 2022, the band announced a one-night-only concert on Saturday October 15 at Fabrique in Milan, celebrating the 20th anniversary of their third studio album, Comalies.

The album title and track listing were revealed 15 July 2022. The album would not be just a re-recording of the Comalies songs, but rather the band stated that they would "deconstruct and transport them into 2022". The band released the first single from the album, "Tight Rope XX", on 19 July 2022. The second single, "Swamped XX", was released on 15 September 2022.

Track listing
All song written and composed by Lacuna Coil.

Personnel

Lacuna Coil
 Andrea Ferro – vocals
 Cristina Scabbia – vocals
 Richard Meiz – drums (tracks 1-1 to 1-13)
 Cristiano Mozzati – drums (tracks 2-1 to 2-13)
 Diego Cavallotti – guitar (tracks 1-1 to 1-13)
 Cristiano Migliore – guitar (tracks 2-1 to 2-13)
 Marco Emanuele Biazzi – guitar (tracks 2-1 to 2-13)
 Marco "Maki" Coti Zelati – bass guitar, guitar, synth

Technical
 Waldemar Sorychta – production, engineering (tracks 2-1 to 2-13)
 Marco "Maki" Coti Zelati – production (tracks 1-1 to 1-13)
 Lacuna Coil – arrangements
 Marco D'Agostino – mastering (tracks 1-1 to 1-13)
 Marco Barusso – mixing (tracks 1-1 to 1-13)
 Georgia Viriglio – engineering (tracks 1-1 to 1-13)
 Marco Barusso – engineering (tracks 1-1 to 1-13)
 Marco "Maki" Coti Zelati – artwork
 Cunene – photography
 Doralba Picerno – photography
 Carsten Drescher - layout
 Eliran Kantor – variant artwork

Charts

References

2022 albums
Lacuna Coil albums
Century Media Records albums